Yellowhead County is a municipal district in west central Alberta, Canada. It is the only municipal district within Alberta census division No. 14.

History 

1994: Established as a Municipal District of Yellowhead No. 94 on January 1.
1998: The name changed to Yellowhead County on July 8.
1998: Evansburg dissolved as a village, and became part of Yellowhead Municipal District on June 30.

Geography

Communities and localities 
The following urban municipalities are surrounded by Yellowhead County.
Cities
none
Towns
Edson
Hinton
Villages
none
Summer villages
none

The following hamlets are located within Yellowhead County.
Hamlets
Brule
Cadomin
Evansburg
Marlboro
Niton Junction
Peers
Robb
Wildwood

The following localities are located within Yellowhead County.
Localities

Ansell
Balkan
Basing
Bickerdike
Branch Inn Trailer Court
Brule Mines
Brûlé Mines
Bryan
Calvert
Carrot Creek
Chip Lake
Coal Valley
Coalspur
Dalehurst
Diss
Drinnan
Embarras
Entrance
Erith
Erith Tie
Fidler

Foothills
Galloway
Granada
Grave Flats
Gregg Subdivision
Haddock
Hanlon
Hansonville
Hargwen
Hattonford
Hoff
Holloway
Hornbeck
Kaydee
Leaman
Leyland
Lobstick
Lovettville
Luscar
MacKay (held hamlet designation from 1979 to 2019)

Mahaska
Matthews Crossing
McLeod River
McLeod Valley
Medicine Lodge
Mercoal
Mountain Park
Mountain View Estates
Niton
Nojack or No Jack
Northville
Obed
Oke
Old Entrance
Park Court
Pedley
Pembina Forks
Pine Dale Subdivision
Pine Shadows
Pinedale (held hamlet designation from 1987 to 2019)

Pinedale Estates
Pioneer
Rangeton
Ravine
Reco
Rosevear
Shaw
Shining Bank
Solomon
Steeper
Sterco
Styal
Swan Landing
Trade Winds Trailer Court
Two Rivers Estates
Weald
Wild Hay
Wolf Creek
Yates

The former Village of Tollerton is also located in Yellowhead County.

Demographics 

In the 2016 Census of Population conducted by Statistics Canada, Yellowhead County had a population of 10,995 living in 4,309 of its 5,048 total private dwellings, a  change from its 2011 population of 10,469.

See also 
List of communities in Alberta
List of municipal districts in Alberta

References

External links 

 
Municipal districts in Alberta